Choghakhor Wetland is a wetland in Chaharmahal and Bakhtiari Province, Iran, considered to be one of the most important sites in Iran for the endemic Zagros pupfish, Aphanius vladykovi.

References

Bibliography
Baqeri, O. 2000. Chaghakhor Wetland and its general characteristics. Moj-e Sabz, Tehran, 1:36-38. In Persian

Geography of Chaharmahal and Bakhtiari Province
Bodies of water of Iran
Ramsar sites in Iran